Anoectochilus sandvicensis, also called Hawaii jewel-orchid, is a species of plant in the family Orchidaceae. It is endemic to Hawaii. It is threatened by habitat loss. It is found in the Haleakala National Park. It grows in dense, dark, and continuously saturated forest.

References

sandvicensis
Endemic flora of Hawaii
Biota of Maui
Orchids of Oceania
Orchids of the United States
~
Plants described in 1840
Taxonomy articles created by Polbot